Samuel George 'S.G.' Ball (1884–1969) was an Australian rugby league administrator.

S.G. Ball (also known as George Ball), was a Rugby League administrator, and is remembered as a co-founder of the South Sydney Rabbitohs.

Background
Ball was born in Waterloo, New South Wales, Australia on 8 February 1884.

Career
On 25 August 1908, S.G. Ball was appointed as a temporary delegate during the absence of other South Sydney delegates whilst on duty with the Kangaroos in England. By 1909 he was appointed as a full-time delegate of the South Sydney Rabbitohs and in 1910 he was appointed vice-president of Souths. By 1911, Ball was appointed the Souths delegate to the NSWRFL in lieu of Arthur Hennessy and in 1912 he became Club-Secretary, a position he held for 54 years. By 1913 was appointed to the management committee of Souths (another position he held for fifty four years) and also in 1913, he was joint-manager, and later full manager of New South Wales rugby league teams and Australian Kangaroo touring teams to New Zealand, England and France - a position he held for decades. S.G.Ball was also CEO/Chairman of the NSWRFL for twenty years between 1917-1937.

S.G. Ball became the 'grand old man' of the South Sydney Rabbitohs who never missed a Souths grand final until the year he died.

Accolades

S.G. Ball was awarded Life-Membership of the South Sydney Rabbitohs in 1961, and was also a Life Member of the NSWRFL.

The S.G. Ball Cup, a rugby league competition for players under the age of 18, was established by the NSWRFL in 1965, and is named in his honour.

Death
S.G. Ball died at his Double Bay, New South Wales home on 26 August 1969, age 85. A large funeral was held for him on 28 August 1969 at St. Mark's Church, Darling Point, New South Wales and he was later buried at South Head Cemetery.

References

Australian rugby league administrators
1884 births
1969 deaths
People from Sydney
South Sydney Rabbitohs
S. G. Ball Cup